Andrewsite is a now discredited mineral originally reported at the Wheal Phoenix mine, near Liskeard in Cornwall. It was named for Thomas Andrews FRS, the English chemist.

It has been shown to be a mixture of hentschelite and rockbridgeite, with minor chalcosiderite.

References

Maskelyne, N. S. (1871) Chemical News and Journal of Industrial Science, London: 24: 99.
Maskelyne, N. S. (1875) 'On Andrewsite and Chalkosiderite' Journal of the Chemical Society, London: 28: 586-591
Frondel, C. (1949) 'The Dufrenite Problem', American Mineralogist: 34: 513–540.
Palache, C., Berman, H., & Frondel, C. (1951), The System of Mineralogy of James Dwight Dana and Edward Salisbury Dana, Yale University 1837–1892, Volume II. John Wiley and Sons, Inc., New York, 7th edition, revised and enlarged, 1124 pp.: 802–803.
Dunn, Pete J. (1990), 'Andrewsite and laubmannite formally discredited', American Mineralogist 75, 1197-1199(1990)

Minerals